In Style may refer to:

 InStyle, a women's fashion magazine founded in 1994
 In Style (David Johansen album)
 In Style (Sonny Stitt album)
 In Style (horse), a show jumping horse